Thomas Raymond Quinlan (born March 27, 1968) is an American former third baseman in Major League Baseball.  Quinlan spent parts of four seasons in the major leagues with the Toronto Blue Jays, Philadelphia Phillies and Minnesota Twins.  He is the older brother of Robb Quinlan, also a former Major League Baseball player.

Quinlan was a two-sport star in high school.  He was also drafted by the National Hockey League's Calgary Flames in the 4th round, 79th overall in the 1986 NHL Entry Draft.  While he did express some interest in playing hockey professionally, Quinlan ultimately focused on baseball. Quinlan became the first foreign-born Korean Series MVP when he led the Hyundai Unicorns to their Korean Series championship in 2000. 

Tom and Robb Quinlan are part of the ownership group for the St. Croix River Hounds, a collegiate summer baseball team intended to play in the Northwoods League though they are not on the 2023 schedule.

References

External links

Career statistics and player information from Korea Baseball Organization

1968 births
Living people
American expatriate baseball players in Canada
American expatriate baseball players in South Korea
American men's ice hockey right wingers
Ice hockey people from Saint Paul, Minnesota
Baseball players from Saint Paul, Minnesota
Calgary Flames draft picks
Colorado Springs Sky Sox players
Hyundai Unicorns players
Ice hockey players from Minnesota
Iowa Cubs players
KBO League infielders
Korean Series MVPs
Knoxville Blue Jays players
LG Twins players
Major League Baseball third basemen
Minnesota Twins players
Myrtle Beach Blue Jays players
Oklahoma RedHawks players
Philadelphia Phillies players
Salt Lake Buzz players
Scranton/Wilkes-Barre Red Barons players
Syracuse Chiefs players
Toronto Blue Jays players